The 1934 Duquesne Dukes football team was an American football team that represented Duquesne University as an independent during the 1934 college football season. In its first and only season under head coach Joe Bach, Duquesne compiled an 8–2 record and outscored opponents by a total of 322 to 22. The team played its home games at Forbes Field in Pittsburgh.

Fullback Art Strutt led the team, and ranked second in the East, with 18 touchdowns and 108 points scored.

Schedule

References

Duquesne
Duquesne Dukes football seasons
Duquesne Dukes football